Muchtar Lutfi (born March 17, 1960), commonly known as Opie Kumis, is an Indonesian actor and comedian.

Career 
Opie began to be known when starring in  Lorong Waktu  (1999). After that he often participate in a variety of television soap operas, especially the comedy genre. Besides, he also frequently appeared as a guest star in many comedy shows such as: Opera Van Java, as well as other talk show. He also participated several times in the boy band parody group along with several other comedian actors such as Parto, Nunung, Sule, Andre Taulany, etc.

Filmography

Film
 Ketika (2004)
 Nagabonar Jadi 2 (2009)
 Jagad X Code (2009)
 KTPnya Sih Islam Bro... (2012)
 Mama Minta Pulsa (2012)
 Jeritan Danau Terlarang (2013)
 Malam Suro di Rumah Darmo (2014)
 Baper (2016)

Comedy
 Pesbukers

References

External links
  Profil Opie Kumis di wowkeren.com
 

Indonesian actors
Living people
1960 births
People from Jakarta
Indonesian male comedians
Indonesian comedians